The Treaty for friendship and alliance between Bulgaria and Germany was a military treaty signed on 1 September 1915 in Sofia between the Kingdom of Bulgaria and the German Empire. It was signed by the Bulgarian Prime-minister Vasil Radoslavov and the German Chancellor Georg Michaelis.

Terms
According to the treaty, both states agreed not to enter in an alliance against the other state, to follow policy of friendship and to help each other.

According to Annex 2 Germany guaranteed "with all its efforts the political independence and the territorial integrity of Bulgaria... against every attack or claim from any country." Bulgaria agreed to help Germany with its whole army in case "Germany is attacked without reason by a country bordering with Bulgaria."

This treaty along with the Secret Bulgarian-German agreement, the Military convention between Germany, Austria-Hungary and Bulgaria and the Bulgarian–Ottoman convention also signed on 6 September allied Bulgaria with the Central Powers in World War I.

The treaty was for five years and was to be secret until the official entering of Bulgaria in the war.

External links
WW1live

World War I treaties
Bulgaria in World War I
German Empire in World War I
Treaties concluded in 1915
Treaties entered into force in 1915
Bulgaria-German treaty (1915)
Bulgaria-German treaty (1915)
1915 in Bulgaria
1915 in Germany
Military alliances involving Bulgaria
Military alliances involving the German Empire
1915 establishments in Bulgaria
1915 establishments in Germany
1918 disestablishments in Bulgaria
1918 disestablishments in Germany
20th-century military alliances
Bulgaria–Germany military relations